Kalinowiec may refer to the following places:
Kalinowiec, Kuyavian-Pomeranian Voivodeship (north-central Poland)
Kalinowiec, Maków County in Masovian Voivodeship (east-central Poland)
Kalinowiec, Węgrów County in Masovian Voivodeship (east-central Poland)
Kalinowiec, Greater Poland Voivodeship (west-central Poland)